Xinjing Township is a township in Tongwei County, Gansu province, China. , it has 13 villages under its administration.

See also 
 List of township-level divisions of Gansu

References 

Township-level divisions of Gansu
Tongwei County